In mathematics the estimation lemma, also known as the  inequality, gives an upper bound for a contour integral.

In particular, we may take the maximum

as upper bound. Intuitively, the lemma is very simple to understand. If a contour is thought of as many smaller contour segments connected together, then there will be a maximum  for each segment. Out of all the maximum s for the segments, there will be an overall largest one.

Formally, the inequality can be shown to hold using the definition of contour integral, the absolute value inequality for integrals and the formula for the length of a curve as follows:

The estimation lemma is most commonly used as part of the methods of contour integration with the intent to show that the integral over part of a contour goes to zero as  goes to infinity. An example of such a case is shown below.

Example 

Problem.
Find an upper bound for

where  is the upper half-circle  with radius  traversed once in the counterclockwise direction.

Solution.
First observe that the length of the path of integration is half the circumference of a circle with radius , hence

Next we seek an upper bound  for the integrand when . By the triangle inequality we see that

therefore
 
Hence

The resulting bound is

See also
Jordan's lemma

References 

 .
 .

Theorems in complex analysis
Lemmas in analysis